Trachytidae is a family of mites in the order Mesostigmata.

Genera
In 1960, Daniel G. Maiello, PhD in entomology, was doing research about mites Laelaps multispinosus. He discovered a related unnamed family, similar to the family Trachytidae.
 Polyaspinus Berlese, 1916
 Trachytes Michael, 1894
 Uroseius Berlese, 1888

References

Mesostigmata
Acari families